Alparslan Çelik (born 1982) is a Turkish Islamist-Nationalist. In 2014 he joined the Syrian Turkmen Brigades and fought against the Syrian Army. On 24 November, after Turkey shot down a Russian bomber jet, he allegedly killed the Russian pilot Oleg Peshkov. Çelik was detained in İzmir, Turkey on 31 March 2016. All charges against him were dropped on 9 May 2016.

His father Ramazan Çelik was the Mayor of Keban for the Nationalist Movement Party

References 

Living people
Turkish nationalists
Turkish criminals
People from Keban, Elazığ
1982 births